Casa de Leones (English: House of Lions), also known as Los Leones, were a Puerto Rican reggaeton group.

Professional career
The members of the group are Miguel A. De Jesús (Guelo Star), Jaime Borges and Charlie Carlson (lead singer) and Héctor Padilla (J-King & Maximan), Randy Ortiz and Joel Muñoz (Jowell & Randy). All five members began their music career writing and producing for other artists, establishing them in the world of reggaeton and rap. In 2007, they joined forces and were taken on by the reggaeton producers of Black Lion Records, Carlos “Karly” Rosario & Elías De León.

Their first studio/compilation album was released on June 26, 2007, and their single hit song No Te Veo MLP reached #1 in The Billboard Hot Latin Charts.

In 2008 Los Leones stopped performing as a group; however, since this was a result of poor contract negotiation and not animosity within the group, sometimes they continue to meet and perform. The five former members are still signed by White Lion and still have a close working relationship.

On September 14, 2010, Guelo Star confirmed on his Twitter account that the members of Los Leones had been getting together for the production of the album Casa De Leones 2. He announced a 2014 release for the album, but this has not been confirmed yet. 

On July 7, 2012, all the members of Los Leones were added on the remix to Yomo's single "En Serio". This was the first time in two years that the artists were reunited on a track. On October 6, 2012: Casa De Leones reunited once again for a track made by members J-King & Maximan, "Que La Nota Le Suba" was remixed with the added vocals of Guelo Star, Jowell & Randy.

Discography

Albums

Singles

Jowell & Randy albums
Studio 

Mixtapes

J King & Maximan albums

Studio

Mixtapes

Guelo Star albums

Studio

Mixtapes

External links 
J-King & Maximan - Official
Official MySpace

Puerto Rican musical groups
Musical groups established in 2007
Reggaeton groups
Musical groups from Ponce, Puerto Rico
Warner Music Latina artists
2007 establishments in Puerto Rico